Ami, Yasin Ar Amar Madhubala ('Me, Yasin and my honeymoon') is a 2007 Indian Bengali film directed and written by Buddhadev Dasgupta. The film was screened at the Toronto International Film Festival.

Plot
When a Kolkata surveillance specialist and his roommate install a small camera in the home of their beautiful neighbor, they somehow become terror suspects in director Buddhadeb Dasgupta's cutting commentary on CCTV society. Yasin (Amitav Bhattacharya) and his roommate Dilip (Prosenjit Chatterjee) are smitten with their beautiful new neighbor Rekha (Sameera Reddy). Innocent pining becomes silent obsession, however, when Dilip decides to install a surveillance camera directly over Rekha's bed. At first Rekha remains blissfully unaware that her privacy has been invaded, but when she finally realizes she's being spied on, her nosy neighbors are forced to go on the run. Little do Yasin and Dilip realize that across town a terrorist cell is plotting their latest attack, and now the local authorities believe that Yasin may be a key part of their diabolical plans.

Cast
Amitav Bhattacharya as  Yasin
Prasenjit Chatterjee as Dilip
Sameera Reddy as  Rekha

References

External links
 

2007 films
2000s Bengali-language films
Bengali-language Indian films
Films directed by Buddhadeb Dasgupta
Films set in Kolkata